Meyer Optik Görlitz (or Goerlitz; German), originally Hugo Meyer & Co., was a former optical company from Görlitz in Germany. 
It was founded in 1896 by optician Hugo Meyer (May 21, 1863 - March 1, 1905) and businessman Heinrich Schätze. The company got off to a successful start with the development of the wide-angle Aristostigmat lens and the subsequent acquisition of Optical Institute Schulze and Billerbeck, the manufacturers of “Euryplan lenses”, as they were called at the time.

History 

A key business decision was made in 1920 when the company decided to work with former Zeiss developer Paul Rudolph, who was previously significantly involved in the success of the Protar, Planar and Tessar lenses. Rudolph also gave Meyer Optik access to his patent for the so-called Plasmat lenses, which at the time included one of the most powerful lenses in the world. In 1936, the company was renamed Optische und Feinmechanische Werke Hugo Meyer & Co and produced approximately 100,000 lenses a year. During World War II, civilian production discontinued and mainly optical components for telescopes were produced.

After the war, the company was expropriated from the Saxony armaments industry and management under the name VEB Optisch-Feinmechanische Werke Görlitz. In the post-war era, the company produced mainly Trioplan triplets, usually for viewfinder cameras produced by Dresden-based camera manufacturers Welta, Balda, Beier, and Altissa. After being integrated into the VEB Pentacon and VEB Carl Zeiss collectives, the Meyer-Optik name was no longer inscribed on lenses after 1971. Many products were discontinued in favor of competing models produced by Carl Zeiss, while the equipment required to produce high-quality zoom lenses could not be procured.

In 1990, Feinoptische Werk Görlitz was spun off from VEB Carl Zeiss and converted into a private limited company and started to produce lenses with the Meyer-Optik logo. However, despite privatization efforts, the company was unable to attract investors and was liquidated shortly after.

In 2014, net SE, a publicly listed company (NETK) founded in 1997, working with the brand manager Globell B.V., exhibited new lenses under the Meyer-Optik-Görlitz name at the Photokina trade fair and began delivering the lenses in December of the same year.

In May 2015, net SE created a new subsidiary, Meyer Optik USA Inc., to distribute Meyer-Optik-Görlitz brands in the United States. Meyer Optik USA is headquartered in Atlanta, GA.  That same year, net SE - Globell Deutschland launched a Kickstarter campaign to produce the Trioplan f2.9/50, a special new lens that revived the tradition of a versatile "soap-bubble" bokeh lens.

More recent reports have net SE, the company behind the modern Meyer Optik Görlitz trademark, running what looks very much like an illegal ponzi pyramid scam, with Kickstarter implicitly assisting by tolerating breaches to its terms of service, meant to have restricted exactly this type of event from occurring.  According to the report, net SE had additionally registered multiple other trademarks for respectable, but defunct, historical companies and was pursuing ways to insulate the new entities one from the other.

References 

 Meyer Optik Görlitz website
 net SE 
 Meyer-Optik launches Kickstarter campaign for 50mm 'Soap Bubble Bokeh' Trioplan lens
 How Meyer Optik Görlitz Won at Kickstarter but Failed at Life, by Michael Zhan at Peta Pixel

Technology companies established in 1896
Optics manufacturing companies
1896 establishments in Germany
Manufacturing companies established in 1896
German brands
Lens manufacturers
Photography companies of Germany